Johnny C. Garrett (born August 8, 1978) is an American attorney and politician from the state of Tennessee. A Republican, Garrett has represented the 45th district of the Tennessee House of Representatives, based in the northern suburbs of Nashville, since 2019.

Education
Garrett earned a Bachelor of Science degree from the University of Tennessee and a Juris Doctor from Nashville School of Law.

Career 
Garrett began practicing law in Sumner County in 2006, representing businesses and entrepreneurs.

In 2018, Courtney Rogers, incumbent for the 45th district of the Tennessee House of Representatives, announced her retirement. Garrett overwhelmingly won the Republican primary to replace her, and defeated Democrat Hana Ali in the general election with nearly 70% of the vote. He was sworn into office in January 2019.

Garrett was elected as majority whip by his House colleagues for the 2020 legislative session.

Personal life
Garrett was born and raised in Goodlettsville, where he continues to live with his wife and three children.

References

Living people
Republican Party members of the Tennessee House of Representatives
21st-century American politicians
1978 births
University of Tennessee alumni
Nashville School of Law alumni